Jeffrey Anderson-Gunter (born 17 September 1946) is a Jamaican-born actor.

Introduction
He was born and raised in Kingston, Jamaica.  He spent his childhood like most children who weren't in the acting business. He moved to America in his early twenties.  He is currently single and he has never been married, and he is  years old.  His professional career in the realm of acting is very broad and he has done a lot to keep the arts alive with younger generations. People tend to know of him as being a well-rounded actor.  He not only continues his acting career in the current days, he also directs, and teaches children.  As an actor, he has made the choice to make most of his life private, to keep his private life out of the public's hands.    He attended Boston University, and studied at London's Academy of Business and Dramatic Arts.  He started his career by being an extra in Michael Jackson's music video for 1991's "Black or White".  He was in two Broadway productions, twenty television series, and numerous movies.  The most memorable show he has been in was Hudson Street; this is also what he is most famous for his acting on the television show Hudson Street.  Though he has been in many television shows along with movies and live shows.  He is continually active with organisations dealing with sickle cell disease, he contributes to the charities dealing with this disease.  He announced in May 2013, that he is working on a new film in Jamaica and he is very excited to be working on this new project.

Early life
He was born 17 September 1946 in Jamaica's capital of Kingston.  He spent his entire childhood in Jamaica.  Jeffrey wasn't a child star, he had a fairly normal childhood.  He left Jamaica and moved to the US in 1968.  When he moved to America he wasn't fully immersed in the realm of acting quite yet.   Before he became famous he had various jobs including a sales clerk at a clothing store.  Spending his early days having varying jobs like most teens kept him grounded.  The occupations he is famous for include acting, teaching and directing.  Not only did he act on the big screen, he also was a Broadway actor.  Before getting his big break in Hollywood he attended Boston University, and after graduating he then studied at London's Academy of Business and Dramatic Arts.   He broke into the business in 1991 after premiering in Michael Jackson's Black and White music video.  Along with when a large picture of him appeared on the cover of The New York Times.  That's how he got his start in Hollywood.  Though nowadays he tends to stay out of the news, he prefers to keep his life private.  He now currently resides in Los Angeles.  Where he not only uses his passion for the dramatic arts acting in front of the camera.  Though he also likes spending time behind the camera as a director.   He also spends some of his time teaching, in hopes of keeping the arts alive.

His favourite childhood memory from when he saw his first movie, One Potato, Two Potato. He was around the age of nine living in Jamaica. He moved to America in his twenties, so his entire childhood was spent in Jamaica.  At the age of nine when he saw his first movie his passion for the arts grew and are still alive today.  He is known for his works in all different genres of movies, and shows.

Accomplishments

Anderson-Gunter is a Drama-Logue award-winning stage director. He also has been nominated at the Beverly Hills/Hollywood NAACP Awards for directing of his various projects. His accomplishments include all of the movies or plays he has been involved with, which includes Naked Gun : The Final Insult. The third instalment of the Naked Gun was nominated for a Golden Screen award in 1994, which it won. Along with the Golden Screen award two other actors in the film were nominated and won the Razzie awards, these were O. J. Simpson for Worst Supporting Actor and Anna Nicole Smith for Worst New Star.
 
Community involvement and accomplishments are something Anderson-Gunter relates with because he has been a part of big-name events other than his show biz career, such as charity events for the underprivileged of Jamaica. Specifically speaking Jeffrey participated in the Caribbean Classic Golf Invitational in 2006. The charity event included television personality Steve Harvey and others such as Anthony Anderson, Marcus Allen, Richard 'John Shaft' Roundtree, Boris Kodjoe, Sandra Denton of Salt N Pepa, and many more. All in all $200,000 was raised by the Caribbean Classic Golf Invitational, $80,000 was donated by the Steve Harvey Charity Foundation. Proceeds from the event were then used to establish technology centres in Jamaica. Also with the goal of the money the event was also used to promote Jamaica as a tourist destination for the world to enjoy and increase competitiveness within the Jamaican community to involve the island country in the global community. Anderson-Gunter has been involved with nearly every Caribbean Classic Golf Invitational charity event since its inception in 2005, the golf event still occurs every summer in Montego Bay, Jamaica. Anderson-Gunter is on the Jamaican team that is in a battle with 11 other Caribbean countries to raise the most money for Dell Computers. Cedric "The Entertainer" was a part of the event in 2009 and aided to the program by adding two days to feature comedy routines and a boxing tournament for added support for the funding of computers. The boxing tournament is known as the "Champions of Champions II" and features local talents from around the Caribbean. The winners of the Caribbean Classic Golf Invitational and the "Champions of Champions II" boxing tournament were presented awards for their honours; the Jamaican Celebrity Golf team that Jeffrey was a part of was able to raise the most money in 2009, which accounted for nearly $400,000.

Broadway career and events
Jeffrey Gunter played roles not only on television shows, but on Broadway as well.  He was able to host and perform many events, his first one being 13 February 2005.  It was hosted in New York City at Town Hall and was a salute to the influence of Woody King Jr's New Federal Theatre (NFT) in the Black Arts Movement (BAM). Jeffrey Anderson-Gunter was a special guest performing at this event, along others such as Denzel Washington and Samuel L. Jackson.  On 6 May 2012 the event Broadway Bound was again co hosted by Jeffrey Anderson-Gunter along with Obie award winner Charlayne Woodard.  The event featured veteran actors, singers and dancers of Broadway. On 29 June 2013 the California African American Museum hosted 4 July festivities.  Jeffrey was the co host of this event, alongside Nita Whitaker Lafontaine.

On 31 July 1979 Jeffrey played a few roles in his first broadway debut at 33 years of age.  The Broadway production was titled But Never Jam Today.  The musical was performed at the Longacre Theatre in New York City and was produced by Arch Nadler and Anita MacShane.  It was choreographed by Talley Beatty and directed by Vinnette Carroll. This Broadway play had 8 performances and 6 previews.  Jeffrey Anderson-Gunter had four roles in this performance.  He played the roles of the Mushroom, the White Rabbit, the Mock Turtle, and the Cheshire Cat.  He acted alongside other Broadway performers such as Brenda Braxton and Sharon K. Brooks.  The play was a musical based on the previous musical Alice which premiered in May 1978 and included characters such as the Queen of Hearts, the Mad Hatter and Humpty Dumpty.

On 27 March 1980 Jeffrey Anderson-Gunter starred in the musical Reggae on Broadway.  This production was produced by Michael Butler, Eric Nezhad, and David Cogan.  The numbers were choreographed by Mike Malone with Glenda Dickerson alongside directing.  There were 21 performances of the musical and 11 previews.  The setting of the musical was "One day in Jamaica" and the storyline was based on reggae music and Rastafari. It was based on a Jamaican pop singer that became successful in the USA before returning home and reuniting with an old lover who is in trouble with gangs and drug abuse.  Jeffrey was part of the opening night cast as an ensemble that performed a musical number in a group with 16 others.

Acting career
Jeffrey Anderson-Gunter has appeared in a wide variety of movies. These movies have consisted of anything from Malcolm in the Middle to the comedy Naked Gun that stars Leslie Nielsen.

He starred in Hudson Street, as Winston Silvira for 22 episodes in 1995–1996. The show was created by Randy Mayem Singer and included other stars such as Tony Danza, Lori Laughlin and Jerry Adler. Hudson Street was nominated for the Young Artist Award for the best performance of a young actor, Frankie J Galasso. The show was based on a divorced detective living in Hoboken, New Jersey who has shared custody of his son with his ex-wife.  It then follows the life of this detective trying to balance work, raising his son, and a new romance with another crime reporter.
 
He also starred as Vince in the series Union Square which aired in 1997–1998.  It was written by Fred Barron and George McGrath and produced by Tim Berry with a running time of 30 minutes. The series was based in a diner in New York City.  It follows the life of a lawyer who attempted to gain inspiration from the folks and environment around him in this diner. The show was shut down after one season of being on the NBC network.  It included a cast of Harriet Sansom Harris, Jim Pirri, John Slaven, Christine Burke, Michael Landes, along with Jeffrey Anderson-Gunter that appeared in all 14 episodes that the show aired.

The majority of his roles are small parts in more well-known movies or shows. He has been a cab driver in Hunter; it was only one episode. Hunter is a police drama created by Frank Lupo. Sgt. Rick Hunter was the main character starring Frank Dryer. Hunter was a popular show in the late 1980s and early 1990s, it lasted 7 seasons. Sgt. Rick Hunter and his partner McCall would chase after perpetrators and the episode would end up in a shootout ending with the bad guy dying.

He played a Rastafarian during Hangin' with Mr. Cooper, another one-time appearance. Hangin' with Mr. Cooper was a sitcom that aired on ABC from 1992 to 1997. The show was produced by Jeff Franklin Productions, a smaller break-off company of Warner Bros. Mark Cooper, the main character, was played by Mark Curry, a former NBA player changed to a high school gym teacher.

He played Reggie on the TV series, In the House, in four episodes. In the House was about an NFL player on the Los Angeles Raiders. LL Cool J starred in this show, as a financially troubled football player that rents a few rooms in his house to a newly divorced single mother, Debbie Allen. The comedy based sitcom lasted 5 seasons, the first two on NBC and the last three on UPN. It was a nominated outstanding comedy series by the NAACP image awards.

In Pacific Blue, a 1990s show, he played a man called Juju Man for an episode. This show was a crime drama series that lasted 5 seasons and aired on USA network. The basis of the show was a team of Santa Monica bike cops that solved over dramatic crimes.

Anderson-Gunter was a Jamaican baker in the ALMA-nominated best drama series (1998) Dangerous Minds. Gunter appeared in the first episode of ABC's Dangerous Minds as a Jamaican baker. Dangerous Minds was an award-winning television show that lasted for one season and based on a movie under the same title. María Costa was the main character who played an unconventional teacher of inner city youth that she worked to influence in the episode.

He had a small one episode part in the NYPD Blue, a crime drama show that lasted for 12 seasons. Each episode was a nail biter that included several plot twists and used a considerable number of characters. The show was created by Steve Bochco and David Milch, also the executive producers and writers, the idea for the show was inspired by Bill Clark, a former NYPD member. The show was aired on ABC. The first year it aired, 1994, the show was nominated for outstanding drama series. After all the years the show and people who were a part of the show were nominated for over 100 awards. Some of these big awards were from, the Golden Globe Awards, Emmy Awards, and Satellite Awards.

Malcolm in the Middle also had Anderson-Gunter on their show for an episode. The show was created by Linwood Boomer. Fox broadcasting company started airing the show in 2000. From 2000 to 2005 Malcolm in the Middle showed 7 seasons and had 122 episodes. The show was about an unconventional family facing everyday problems. Frankie Muniz played Malcolm, a genius and a person with a photographic memory. He faces problems that any kid would but he and his family have different ways to solve them. This show was nominated for Comedy Series of the Year in 2002. It also was nominated for Best Episodic Comedy 5 out of 6 years from 2001 to 2006.

Anderson-Gunter played a homeless man in the film Don't be a Menace to South Central While Drinking Your Juice in the Hood. This movie was a parody to movies like Boyz in the Hood. It was directed by Paris Barclay and starred the Wayans brothers, Shawn, Marlon, and Keenen Ivory Wayans. The movie was in theatres in 1996 and brought a little more than $8.1 million in theatres.

Anderson-Gunter also voiced CinnaMon, a mascot for the Kellogg's cereal Apple Jacks. He voiced the character in advertisements for the cereal from 2004 up until 2007.

Film

Television

References

External links

American actors of Jamaican descent
1946 births
Living people
People from Kingston, Jamaica
20th-century Jamaican male actors
21st-century Jamaican male actors
Jamaican male film actors
Jamaican male television actors